Qaleh-ye Astijan (also Romanized as Qal‘eh-ye Āstījān; also known as Qal‘eh-ye Āsījān) is a village in Khorram Rud Rural District, in the Central District of Tuyserkan County, Hamadan Province, Iran. At the 2006 census, its population was 244, in 77 families.

References 

Populated places in Tuyserkan County